The Association of Independent Colleges of Art and Design (AICAD) is a non-profit consortium of 36 art and design schools in the United States and Canada.  All AICAD member institutions have a curriculum with full liberal arts and sciences requirements complementing studio work, and all are accredited to grant Bachelor of Fine Arts and/or Master of Fine Arts degrees.  To qualify for AICAD membership an art school must be: a free-standing college (not a division of a larger college or university) specializing in art or design; a non-profit institution; grant BFA and/or MFA degrees; and have accreditation from both the National Association of Schools of Art and Design (NASAD) and the relevant academic accrediting organization in their region.

AICAD was founded in 1991 by a group of art college presidents for the purpose of sharing information among similar institutions and acting collectively.  Its mission is to strengthen and connect the member colleges, and to inform the public about these colleges and the value of studying art and design.

AICAD distributes information about the organization and its members, and about art and design education and careers, to potential students, parents, teachers, and others.  It conducts regular conferences and symposia on contemporary academic and administrative subjects, operates an independent studio and internship program in New York City (The New York Studio Residency Program), oversees student exchanges among the member schools, gathers and analyzes institutional data to assist in future planning efforts. It also provides members with information about current art and design education issues as well as information on relevant legislation and government policies.

Members

Alberta University of the Arts (formerly Alberta College of Art and Design)
Art Academy of Cincinnati
Art Center College of Design
California College of the Arts
California Institute of the Arts
College for Creative Studies
Columbus College of Art and Design
Cornish College of the Arts
Cranbrook Academy of Art
Emily Carr University of Art and Design
Institute of Art and Design at New England College (formerly the New Hampshire Institute of Art)
Kansas City Art Institute
Laguna College of Art and Design
Lesley Art and Design (formerly the Art Institute of Boston)
Maine College of Art
Maryland Institute College of Art
Massachusetts College of Art and Design
Milwaukee Institute of Art and Design
Minneapolis College of Art and Design
Montserrat College of Art
Moore College of Art and Design
NSCAD University
OCAD University
Otis College of Art and Design
Pacific Northwest College of Art
Parsons School of Design
Pennsylvania Academy of the Fine Arts
Pennsylvania College of Art and Design
Pratt Institute
Rhode Island School of Design
Ringling College of Art and Design
San Francisco Art Institute
School of the Art Institute of Chicago
School of the Museum of Fine Arts at Tufts
School of Visual Arts
University of the Arts

International Affiliates
Bezalel Academy of Arts and Design
Burren College of Art
China Academy of Art
LASALLE College of the Arts
Nanjing University of the Arts
Osaka University of Arts
Plymouth College of Art

Regional accrediting agencies
Middle States Association of Colleges and Schools
New England Association of Schools and Colleges (NEASC)
North Central Association of Colleges and Schools
Northwest Commission on Colleges and Universities
Southern Association of Colleges and Schools (SACS)
Western Association of Schools and Colleges (WASC)

New York Studio Residency Program

The New York Studio Residency Program (NYSRP), a project of AICAD, was a one-semester program in New York City for undergraduate fine arts students enrolled at AICAD colleges. The program emphasized independent, self-directed study in the context of its location in the Dumbo neighborhood of Brooklyn.  The 15 to 20 students enrolled each fall and spring semester came from all over the US and Canada. The program closed in 2017.

References

External links 
AICAD website
New York Studio Residency Program website

College and university associations and consortia in North America